Several Canadian naval units have been named HMCS Chicoutimi.

 (I) was a Flower-class corvette that served with the Royal Canadian Navy during the Second World War; commissioned in 1940 and retired in 1945.

Battle honours
Atlantic, 1941–44.

References

Directorate of History and Heritage – HMCS Chicoutimi 

Royal Canadian Navy ship names